Malaoxon (Liromat, Malation oxon, Malthon oxon) is a chemical compound with the formula C10H19O7PS. More specifically, it is a phosphorothioate. It is a breakdown product of, and more toxic than, malathion.

Air and water  

This chemical may be sensitive to prolonged exposure to air. Slightly water-soluble.

Fire hazard 

This chemical is combustible.

Health hazard 
Symptoms of exposure to this type of compound include cholinesterase inhibition, miosis, frontal headache, increased bronchial secretion, nausea, vomiting, sweating, abdominal cramps, diarrhea, lacrimation, increased salivation, bradycardia, cyanosis and muscular twitching of the eyelids, tongue, face and neck, possibly progressing to convulsions. Other symptoms include hyperemia of the conjunctiva, dimness of vision, rhinorrhea, bronchoconstriction, cough, fasciculation, anorexia, incontinence, eye changes, weakness, dyspnea, bronchospasm, hypotension or hypertension due to asphyxia, restlessness, anxiety, dizziness, drowsiness, tremor, ataxia, depression, confusion, neuropathy (rare), coma and death from depression of respiratory or cardiovascular systems. Exposure to this type of compound may result in giddiness, nervousness, blurred vision, discomfort (tightness) in chest, papilledema, muscular weakness, loss of reflexes, loss of sphincter control, cardiac arrhythmias, various degrees of heart block and cardiac arrest. It may also result in spasm of accommodation, aching pain in and about the eye, nystagmus, delayed distal axonopathy and paresthesias and paralysis of limbs. A decrease in blood pressure may occur. Respiratory failure may also occur.

Acute/chronic hazards 
This compound is toxic by ingestion. It is a cholinesterase inhibitor. 
When heated to decomposition, it emits toxic fumes of sulfur oxides and phosphorus oxides.

Reactivity profile 
A thioorganophosphate, ester. Organophosphates are susceptible to formation of highly toxic and flammable phosphine gas in the presence of strong reducing agents such as hydrides. Partial oxidation by oxidizing agents may result in the release of toxic phosphorus oxides. Esters react with acids to liberate heat along with alcohols and acids. Strong oxidizing acids may cause a vigorous reaction that is sufficiently exothermic to ignite the reaction products. Heat is also generated by the interaction of esters with caustic solutions. Flammable hydrogen is generated by mixing esters with alkali metals and hydrides.

References

Acetylcholinesterase inhibitors
Organothiophosphate esters